Tomlinson D. Todd was a civil rights activist located in Washington, D.C. He was the acting director for the Institute on Race in 1941–1951 and the creator/host of the radio program "American All", which focused on education reform and implementing strategies for political empowerment.

Early life
Tomlinson was born in Reading, PA but was raised in Washington, D.C.

Career
Tomlinson was credited for bringing many issues to light, and worked to bring an end to segregation and the Jim Crow laws through non-violent demonstrations. His work as president-elect of the Institute on Race lead him to discover laws from 1872 (entitled "Lost Laws") where it was legal for restaurants and other public spaces to discriminate against African Americans after the Civil War. Once discovered, these issues were able to be addressed and segregation soon ended for restaurants in the 1950s.

Later life
In his later life he ended up serving the Washington, D.C. community as a drivers education teacher, before passing away at the age of 76.

References

American civil rights activists